Events in the year 2014 in Italy.

Incumbents
President: Giorgio Napolitano
Prime Minister: Enrico Letta (until 22 February), Matteo Renzi (starting 22 February)

Events

January
 15 January - Italy says that it will use the Italian Army against the mafia who are accused of dumping toxic waste in Naples.
 25 January - A vial containing drops of late Pope John Paul II's blood is stolen from the Church of San Pietro della Ienca in Abruzzo.

February
 14 February – Italian Prime Minister Enrico Letta resigns after pressure from his own Democratic Party to step down.

April
 12 April – An anti-austerity protest in Rome turns violent: people being injured in clashes between angry protesters and riot police number at least one (according to AP)

June
1 June - The 2014 Italian motorcycle Grand Prix is held at the Mugello Circuit in Scarperia, and is won by Marc Márquez.

September
 7 September - The 2014 Italian Grand Prix is held at the Autodromo Nazionale Monza, and is won by Lewis Hamilton.

October
 31 October – Italian Interior Minister Angelino Alfano announced the end of Operation Mare Nostrum.

November
15 November - Singer Vincenzo Cantiello wins Junior Eurovision Song Contest 2014 for Italy. He was also Italy's debut entrant in the competition, marking the first time since the inaugural contest that a country won in its debut year.

December

Deaths
January 11 – Arnoldo Foà, 97, actor
January 20 – Claudio Abbado, 80, conductor
January 22 – Carlo Mazzacurati, 57, director
January 31 – Giorgio Stracquadanio, 54, politician
April 6 – Massimo Tamburini, 70, motorcycle designer
April 13 – Emma Castelnuovo, 100, teacher
July 4 – Giorgio Faletti, 63, actor
July 25 - Carlo Bergonzi, 90, operatic tenor
September 4 – Franca Falcucci, 88, politician
September 8 – Magda Olivero, 104, operatic soprano
September 21 – Francesco Fornabaio, 57, aviator
October 11 - Anita Cerquetti, 83, operatic soprano
December 8 – Mango, 60, singer
December 18 – Virna Lisi, 78, actress

See also
 2014 in Italian television
 List of Italian films of 2014

References

 
2010s in Italy
Years of the 21st century in Italy
Italy
Italy